Edouard Bacher (7 March 1846, Postelberg – 16 January 1908, Vienna) was an  Austrian jurisconsult and journalist.

Graduating from the University of Vienna, he engaged in practise as an advocate; in this career, he displayed such marked ability that some years later the Reichsrat appointed him its chief stenographer. In 1872, Bacher began to work for the Neue Freie Presse, the paper which later became Die Presse, as a parliamentary reporter, and on 1 May 1879, he became the chief editor of the paper.

A feature of his time with the Neue Freie Presse was the running battle with the Paris correspondent, the Zionist Theodor Herzl. After his death, Bacher was succeeded by Moriz Benedikt.

References

Sources
Eisenberg, Das Geistige Wien, p. 15;
Adolph Kohut, Berühmte Israelitische Männer und Frauen, p. 133

New York Times book review touching on his relationship with Theodor Herzl

1846 births
1908 deaths
People from Postoloprty
Austro-Hungarian Jews
19th-century Austrian journalists
Austrian newspaper editors
University of Vienna alumni
20th-century Austrian journalists
Austrian people of German Bohemian descent